Stac Rhos is a top of Pen y Boncyn Trefeilw in north east Wales. It forms a part of the Berwyn range called the Hirnantau.

The views from the summit are extensive, if unremarkable due to the featureless, flat moorland surroundings.  The summit is marked by a small cairn, and a boundary stone. To the east is Cyrniau Nod, while Cefn Gwyntog is to the south-east.

References

Llangywer
Llanwddyn
Mountains and hills of Gwynedd
Mountains and hills of Powys
Hewitts of Wales
Nuttalls